Eleven United States presidents and one president-elect have made presidential visits to South America. The first trip was made by Herbert Hoover (as president-elect) in 1928. During this tour he delivered twenty-five speeches in ten Central and South American countries, almost all of which stressed his plans to reduce American political and military interference in Latin American affairs. In sum, he pledged that the United States would act as a "good neighbor."

The first official visits by a sitting president were those of Franklin D. Roosevelt, and were an offshoot of Allied diplomatic interactions during World War II. Of the 12 independent countries on the continent, all but Bolivia, Guyana and  Paraguay have been visited by an American president. Ecuador has only been visited by a president elect.

Table of visits

Travels of former presidents

Theodore Roosevelt 

Theodore Roosevelt, along with Cândido Rondon, explorered the 1000-mile long "River of Doubt" (later renamed Rio Roosevelt) located in a remote area of the Amazon basin in 1913–14. Sponsored in part by the American Museum of Natural History, they also collected many new animal and insect specimens.

Jimmy Carter
Jimmy Carter, along with Carter Center personnel, met with São Paulo Governor José Serra and former president Fernando Cardoso; received special human rights award; and met with a roundtable of preeminent business and financial leaders in São Paulo. Also met with President Lula da Silva, Foreign Minister Celso Amorim, and other Brazilian leaders in Brasilia, May 3–4, 2009.

See also
 Foreign policy of the United States
 Latin America–United States relations

References

Argentina–United States relations
Brazil–United States relations
Bolivia–United States relations
Chile–United States relations
Colombia–United States relations
Ecuador–United States relations
Guyana–United States relations
Peru–United States relations
Paraguay–United States relations
Lists of United States presidential visits